In numerical analysis, catastrophic cancellation is the phenomenon that subtracting good approximations to two nearby numbers may yield a very bad approximation to the difference of the original numbers.

These may be good approximations, in relative error, to the true lengths: the approximations are in error by less than 2% of the true lengths, .

The difference of the approximations, is in error by 100% of the magnitude of the difference of the 
true values, .

Catastrophic cancellation isn't affected by how large the inputs are—it applies just as much to large and small inputs.
It depends only on how large the difference is, and on the error of the inputs.

Catastrophic cancellation may happen even if the difference is computed exactly, as in the example above—it is not a property of any particular kind of arithmetic like floating-point arithmetic; rather, it is inherent to subtraction, when the inputs are approximations themselves.  Indeed, in floating-point arithmetic, when the inputs are close enough, the floating-point difference is computed exactly, by the Sterbenz lemma—there is no rounding error introduced by the floating-point subtraction operation.

Formal analysis 

Thus, the relative error of the exact difference  of the approximations from the difference  of the true values is

In numerical algorithms 
Subtracting nearby numbers in floating-point arithmetic does not always cause catastrophic cancellation, or even any error—by the Sterbenz lemma, if the numbers are close enough the floating-point difference is exact.
But cancellation may amplify errors in the inputs that arose from rounding in other floating-point arithmetic.

Example: Difference of squares 

by the floating-point arithmetic

The alternative factoring
,
evaluated by the floating-point arithmetic
,
avoids catastrophic cancellation because it avoids introducing rounding error leading into the subtraction.

For example, if

and
,
then the true value of the difference

is
.
In IEEE 754 binary64 arithmetic, evaluating the alternative factoring

gives the correct result exactly (with no rounding), but evaluating the naive expression

gives the floating-point number
,
of which less than half the digits are correct and the other (underlined) digits reflect the missing terms , lost due to rounding when calculating the intermediate squared values.

Example: Complex arcsine 
When computing the complex arcsine function, one may be tempted to use the logarithmic formula directly:

If  is evaluated in floating-point arithmetic giving

with any error , where  denotes floating-point rounding, then computing the difference

Example: Radix conversion 

Numerical constants in software programs are often written in decimal, such as in the C fragment double x = 1.000000000000001; to declare and initialize an IEEE 754 binary64 variable named x.
Although the radix conversion from decimal floating-point to binary floating-point only incurs a small relative error, catastrophic cancellation may amplify it into a much larger one:

double x = 1.000000000000001;  // rounded to 1 + 5*2^{-52}
double y = 1.000000000000002;  // rounded to 1 + 9*2^{-52}
double z = y - x;              // difference is exactly 4*2^{-52}

Benign cancellation 

Cancellation is sometimes useful and desirable in numerical algorithms.
For example, the 2Sum and Fast2Sum algorithms both rely on such cancellation after a rounding error in order to exactly compute what the error was in a floating-point addition operation as a floating-point number itself.

The function
,
if evaluated naively at points
,
.
However, the function

itself is well-conditioned at inputs near .
Rewriting it as

exploits cancellation in

to avoid the error from

evaluated directly.
This works because the cancellation in the numerator

and the cancellation in the denominator

counteract each other; the function

is well-enough conditioned near zero that

gives a good approximation to
,
and thus

gives a good approximation to
.

References 

Numerical analysis